Chak Shafi Khurd is a village situated in Tehsil Arifwala, Pakpattan district, Punjab Province of Pakistan. The village is situated on the bank of a branch of Pakpattan Canal. It is an agricultural village where wheat, maize, sugarcane, cotton and rice are grown. Population of the village is 1785, and all the people are Muslim. There is a primary school in the village.

References

Populated places in Pakpattan District